Espinel may refer to:

Eduardo Espinel (born 1972), Uruguayan football manager and former player
Ileana Espinel (1933–2001), Ecuadorian journalist, poet and writer
Luis Espinel (born 1967), Ecuadorian football manager and former player
Luisa Espinel (1892–1963), American singer, dancer and actress, born Luisa Ronstadt
Mauricio Rodas Espinel (born 1975), Ecuadorian lawyer, Metropolitan Mayor of Quito
Vicente Espinel (1550–1624), Spanish writer and musician of the Siglo de Oro
Victoria Espinel (born 1968), the president and CEO of The Software Alliance
Pedro Espinel Torres (1908–1981), Peruvian composer

See also
Espin (disambiguation)
Espinal (disambiguation)
Espínola